George Owen  was a Welsh Anglican priest in the 17th century.

Owen was educated at Merton College, Oxford. He held livings at Lampeter Velfrey, Narberth and Stackpole. He was archdeacon of St Davids from 1678 until his death on 20 October 1690.

References

Alumni of Merton College, Oxford
Archdeacons of St Davids
17th-century Welsh Anglican priests
1890 deaths